Amitav Ghosh (born 11 July 1956) is an Indian writer. He won the 54th Jnanpith award in 2018, India's highest literary honor. Ghosh's ambitious novels use complex narrative strategies to probe the nature of national and personal identity, particularly of the people of India and South Asia. He has written historical fiction and also written non-fiction works discussing topics such as colonialism and climate change.

Ghosh studied at The Doon School, Dehradun, and earned a doctorate in social anthropology at the University of Oxford. He worked at the Indian Express newspaper in New Delhi and several academic institutions. His first novel The Circle of Reason was published in 1986, which he followed with later fictional works including The Shadow Lines and The Glass Palace. Between 2004 and 2015, he worked on the Ibis trilogy, which revolves around the build-up and implications of the First Opium War. His non-fiction work includes In an Antique Land and The Great Derangement: Climate Change and the Unthinkable.

Ghosh holds two Lifetime Achievement awards and four honorary doctorates. In 2007 he was awarded the Padma Shri, one of India's highest honours, by the President of India. In 2010 he was a joint winner, along with Margaret Atwood of a Dan David prize, and 2011 he was awarded the Grand Prix of the Blue Metropolis festival in Montreal. He was the first English-language writer to receive the award. In 2019 Foreign Policy magazine named him one of the most important global thinkers of the preceding decade.

Life
Ghosh was born in Calcutta on 11 July 1956 and was educated at the all-boys boarding school The Doon School in Dehradun. He grew up in India, Bangladesh and Sri Lanka. His contemporaries at Doon included author Vikram Seth and historian Ram Guha. While at school, he regularly contributed fiction and poetry to The Doon School Weekly (then edited by Seth) and founded the magazine History Times along with Guha. After Doon, he received degrees from St Stephen's College, Delhi University, and Delhi School of Economics.

He then won the Inlaks Foundation scholarship to complete a D. Phil. in social anthropology at St Edmund Hall, Oxford, under the supervision of British social anthropologist Peter Lienhardt. The thesis, undertaken in the Faculty of Anthropology and Geography, was entitled "Kinship in relation to economic and social organization in an Egyptian village community" and submitted in 1982.

In 2009, he was elected a Fellow of the Royal Society of Literature. In 2015 Ghosh was named a Ford Foundation Art of Change Fellow.

He was awarded the Padma Shri by the Indian government in 2007.

Ghosh returned to India to begin working on the Ibis trilogy which includes Sea of Poppies (2008), River of Smoke (2011), and Flood of Fire (2015).

Ghosh lives in New York with his wife, Deborah Baker, author of the Laura Riding biography In Extremis: The Life of Laura Riding (1993) and a senior editor at Little, Brown and Company. They have two children, Lila and Nayan.

Work

Fiction

Ghosh is the author of The Circle of Reason (his 1986 debut novel), The Shadow Lines (1988), The Calcutta Chromosome (1995), The Glass Palace (2000), The Hungry Tide (2004) and Gun Island (2019).

Ghosh began working on what became The Ibis trilogy in 2004. Set in the 1830s, its story follows the build-up of the First Opium War across China and the Indian Ocean region. Its first instalment Sea of Poppies (2008) was shortlisted for the 2008 Man Booker Prize. This was followed by River of Smoke (2011) and the third, Flood of Fire (2015) completed the trilogy.

The Shadow Lines that won him the Sahitya Akademi Award "throws light on the phenomenon of communal violence and the way its roots have spread deeply and widely in the collective psyche of the Indian subcontinent". Most of his work deals with historical settings, especially in the Indian Ocean periphery. In an interview with Mahmood Kooria, he said: "It was not intentional, but sometimes things are intentional without being intentional. Though it was never part of a planned venture and did not begin as a conscious project, I realise in hindsight that this is really what always interested me most: the Bay of Bengal, the Arabian Sea, the Indian Ocean, and the connections and the cross-connections between these regions."

Ghosh's Gun Island, published in 2019, deals with climate change and human migration, drew praise from critics. According to a review in the Columbia Journal, "This is Ghosh at his tenacious, exhausted best—marrying a mythical tale from his homeland with the plight of the human condition, all the while holding up a mirror to the country that he now calls home." The Guardian however, noted Ghosh's tendency to go on tangents, calling it "a shaggy dog story" that "can take a very roundabout path towards reality, but it will get there in the end."

In 2021, Ghosh published his first book in verse, Jungle Nama, which explores the Sundarbans legend of Bon Bibi.

Non-fiction

Ghosh's notable non-fiction writings are In an Antique Land (1992), Dancing in Cambodia and at Large in Burma (1998), Countdown (1999), and The Imam and the Indian (2002, a collection of essays on themes such as fundamentalism, the history of the novel, Egyptian culture, and literature. His writings appear in newspapers and magazines in India and abroad. In The Great Derangement: Climate Change and the Unthinkable (2016), Ghosh discussed modern literature and art as failing to adequately address climate change.

In 2021, The Nutmeg's Curse: Parables for a Planet in Crisis was published. In it, Ghosh discussed the journey of nutmeg from its native Banda Islands to many other parts of the world, taking this as a lens through which to understand the historical influence of colonialism upon attitudes towards Indigenous cultures and environmental change.

Awards and recognition

The Circle of Reason won the Prix Médicis étranger, one of France's top literary awards. The Shadow Lines won the Sahitya Akademi Award and the Ananda Puraskar. The Calcutta Chromosome won the Arthur C. Clarke Award for 1997. Sea of Poppies was shortlisted for the 2008 Man Booker Prize. It was the co-winner of the Vodafone Crossword Book Award in 2009, as well as co-winner of the 2010 Dan David Prize. River of Smoke was shortlisted for the Man Asian Literary Prize 2011. The government of India awarded him the civilian honour of Padma Shri in 2007. He also received – together with Margaret Atwood – the Israeli Dan David Prize.

Ghosh famously withdrew his novel The Glass Palace from consideration for the Commonwealth Writers' Prize, where it was awarded the best novel in the Eurasian section, citing his objections to the term "commonwealth" and the unfairness of the English language requirement specified in the rules.

Ghosh received the lifetime achievement award at Tata Literature Live, the Mumbai LitFest on 20 November 2016.
He was conferred the 54th Jnanpith award in December 2018 and is the first Indian writer in English to have been chosen for this honour.

Bibliography

Novels
The Circle of Reason (1986)
The Shadow Lines (1988)
The Calcutta Chromosome (1995)
The Glass Palace (2000)
The Hungry Tide (2004)
Sea of Poppies (2008)
River of Smoke (2011)
Flood of Fire (2015)
Gun Island (2019)
Jungle Nama (2021)

Non-Fiction
In an Antique Land (1992)
Dancing in Cambodia and at Large in Burma (1998; Essays)
Countdown (1999)
The Imam and the Indian (2002; Essays)
Incendiary Circumstances (2006; Essays)
The Great Derangement: Climate Change and the Unthinkable (2016)
 The Nutmeg's Curse: Parables for a Planet in Crisis (2021)
Uncanny and Improbable Events (2021)
 The Living Mountain (2022)

See also
 List of Indian writers

Further reading 

 Kalpaklı, Fatma.  Amitav Ghosh ile Elif Şafak’ın Romanlarında Öteki/leştirme/Us and Them Attitude in the Works of Amitav Ghosh and Elif Şafak .   Konya: Çizgi Kitabevi, 2016.

References

External links

Philosophy & Politics of science mutation in Amitav Ghoshs The Calcutta Chromosome

Excerpt from River of Smoke in Guernica Magazine
Sea of Poppies at Farrar, Straus and Giroux site
Amitav Ghosh in Emory University Site
Amitav Ghosh's Blog on Indipepal

1956 births
20th-century essayists
20th-century Indian essayists
20th-century Indian male writers
20th-century Indian non-fiction writers
20th-century Indian novelists
20th-century Indian poets
20th-century poets
21st-century essayists
21st-century Indian essayists
21st-century Indian male writers
21st-century Indian non-fiction writers
21st-century Indian novelists
21st-century Indian poets
21st-century poets
Alumni of St Edmund Hall, Oxford
Anti-imperialism
Bengali novelists
Bengali poets
Bengali writers
Climate activists
The Doon School alumni
English-language poets from India
Environmental fiction writers
Environmental writers
Fellows of the Royal Society of Literature
Harvard University staff
Indian emigrants to the United States
Indian environmentalists
Indian essayists
Indian expatriates in the United States
Indian historical novelists
Indian humanists
Indian literary critics
Indian male non-fiction writers
Indian male novelists
Indian male poets
Indian non-fiction environmental writers
Indian science fiction writers
Indian social commentators
Indian speculative fiction writers
Literary theorists
Living people
Novelists from West Bengal
Prix Médicis étranger winners
Recipients of the Ananda Purashkar
Recipients of the Jnanpith Award
Recipients of the Padma Shri in literature & education
Recipients of the Sahitya Akademi Award in English
St. Stephen's College, Delhi alumni
Sustainability advocates
Delhi University alumni
Writers about activism and social change
Writers about globalization
Writers from Kolkata
Writers of historical fiction set in the early modern period
Writers of historical fiction set in the modern age
Postcolonial literature